(born December 15, 1931 in Tokyo City, Japan) is a Japanese poet and translator. He is one of the most widely read and highly regarded of living Japanese poets, both in Japan and abroad, and a frequent subject of speculations regarding the Nobel Prize in Literature. Several of his collections, including his selected works, have been translated into English, and his Floating the River in Melancholy, translated by William I. Eliott and Kazuo Kawamura, won the American Book Award in 1989.

Tanikawa has written more than 60 books of poetry in addition to translating Charles Schulz's Peanuts and the Mother Goose rhymes into Japanese. He was nominated for the 2008 Hans Christian Andersen Award for his contributions to children's literature. He also helped translate Swimmy by Leo Lionni into Japanese. Among his contributions to less conventional art genres is his open video correspondence with Shūji Terayama (Video Letter, 1983). Since the 1970s Tanikawa also provided short, onomatopoeic verses for picture books he published in collaboration with visual artist Sadamasa Motonaga, whom he had befriended during his residency in New York in 1966, offered by the Japan Society.

He has collaborated several times with the lyricist Chris Mosdell, including creating a deck of cards created in the omikuji fortune-telling tradition of Shinto shrines, titled The Oracles of Distraction. Tanikawa also co-wrote Kon Ichikawa's Tokyo Olympiad and wrote the lyrics to the theme song of Howl's Moving Castle (film). Together with Jerome Rothenberg and Hiromi Itō, he has participated in collaborative renshi poetry, pioneered by Makoto Ōoka.

The philosopher Tetsuzō Tanikawa was his father. The author-illustrator Yōko Sano was his third wife, and illustrated a volume of his poems: Onna Ni, translated by William I. Elliott and Kazuo Kawamura (Shueisha, 2012).

Some of his collections available in translation:

 Two billion light-years of solitude
 62 Sonnets and definitions
 On Love
 To You
 21
 With silence my companion
 Crestfallen
 At midnight in the kitchen …
 The day the birds disappeared from the sky
 Definitions
 Coca-Cola Lessons
 A letter
 Floating down the river in melancholy
 Songs of nonsense
 Naked
 On giving people poems
 The naif
 Listening to Mozart
 To a woman
 Rather than pure white
 Minimal
 Mickey Mouse by night
 A Chagall and a leaf
 Me
 Kokoro
 Ordinary People

References

External links
 New York Times discusses Tanikawa's Selected Works
 Shuntaro Tanikawa at J'Lit Books from Japan 

1931 births
Living people
20th-century Japanese poets
American Book Award winners
Struga Poetry Evenings Golden Wreath laureates